Keno Kevon Wallace (born 10 September 1989) is a West Indian first-class cricketer.

Domestic career

He made his debut for Jamaica in November 2014 in West Indies' Regional Four Day Competition. He has played only two first class matches till date in November-December 2014.

References

External links
 

Jamaica cricketers
1989 births
Living people